Srisailam Assembly constituency is a constituency of the Andhra Pradesh Legislative Assembly, India. It is one of 7 constituencies in the Nandyal district.

Silpa Chakrapani Reddy of YSR Congress Party is currently representing the constituency. Atmakur is the biggest town in Assembly constituency. Tough Srisailam is the Name of Constituency, Atmakur is the HQ of Assembly constituency.

Overview
It is part of the Nandyal Lok Sabha constituency along with another six Vidhan Sabha segments, namely, Allagadda, Nandikotkur, Panyam, Nandyal, Banaganapalle and Dhone in the Kurnool district.

Mandals

Members of Legislative Assembly Srisailam

Election results

Assembly Elections 2009

Assembly elections 2014

Assembly elections 2019

See also
 List of constituencies of Andhra Pradesh Legislative Assembly

References

Assembly constituencies of Andhra Pradesh